Hedythyrsus is a genus of flowering plants belonging to the family Rubiaceae.

Its native range is Central and Eastern Tropical Africa.

Species:

Hedythyrsus katangensis 
Hedythyrsus spermacocinus 
Hedythyrsus thamnoideus

References

Rubiaceae
Rubiaceae genera